Mulberry Fork River can refer to:

Mulberry Fork of the Black Warrior River in Alabama in the United States
Mulberry Fork (Loop Creek), a tributary of Loop Creek in West Virginia
Mulberry Fork River (Kentucky), United States

See also 
 Mulberry River (disambiguation)
 Mulberry River Bridge (disambiguation)